Ghiljo Bazar, also called Ghaljo or Ghalju, is a town in the Khyber Pakhtunkhwa province of Pakistan.  It is currently the summer administrative capital of Orakzai District, and is located in Upper Orakzai Tehsil. The winter administrative capital is Kalaya.

The town is named after the Pashtun tribe Ghilji.
Town was badly affected during Military Operations, but due to the efforts of the security forces, the area was cleared, and normalcy restored.

References

Populated places in Orakzai District